J. Cameron Henry Jr. is an American politician serving as a member of the Louisiana State Senate from the 9th district. He assumed office on January 13, 2020. He previously represented the 82nd district of the Louisiana House of Representatives from 2008 to 2020.

Education 
Henry graduated from Jesuit High School in New Orleans. He earned a Bachelor of Science degree in political science from Louisiana State University and a Master of Business Administration in finance from the Freeman School of Business at Tulane University.

Career 
As a graduate student, Henry served as a legislative aide for Congressman Steve Scalise. He was elected to the Louisiana House of Representatives in 2007 and served until 2020, after which he was elected to the Louisiana State Senate. Henry authored a bill to legalize sports betting in Louisiana.

References 

Living people
Jesuit High School (New Orleans) alumni
Louisiana State University alumni
Freeman School of Business alumni
Tulane University alumni
Republican Party members of the Louisiana House of Representatives
Republican Party Louisiana state senators
Year of birth missing (living people)